The Bank of England Act 1716 (3 Geo. 1 c. 8) was an Act of the Parliament of Great Britain. It was one of the Bank of England Acts 1694 to 1892.

It was partially repealed by the Statute Law Revision Act 1870, the Statute Law Revision Act 1887, the Bank Act 1892, the Bank of England Act 1946, and the Statute Law Revision Act 1948.

All remaining parts of the Act were repealed on 1995-11-08 by the Statute Law (Repeals) Act 1995.

References

External links
 

Great Britain Acts of Parliament 1716
Bank of England
Repealed Great Britain Acts of Parliament
Banking legislation in the United Kingdom
1716 in economics
Banking in Great Britain